Stoked is a Canadian animated series produced by Fresh TV and originally aired from June 25, 2009 to January 26, 2013 on Teletoon in Canada. The show was also broadcast on ABC3 in Australia, where the second half of the second season first aired, and Cartoon Network in the United States, on which it premiered shortly after the Canadian debut.

Series overview

Episodes

Season 1 (2009–10)

Season 2 (2010–13)

References

Lists of Canadian children's animated television series episodes